J.P.Y. is the second studio album recorded by Australian pop singer John Paul Young, released in August 1976. The album was certified platinum in Australia.

Singles 
"I Hate the Music", released in March 1976, reached No. 3 in April and gained gold status. "Keep On Smilin'" was released in August 1976 and peaked at number 15. Standing in the Rain was released internationally in February 1977 and in Australian in December 1977.

Track listing

Side one

Side two

Charts

Certifications

Personnel 
 Producers – Vanda & Young
 Made by EMI (Australia) Limited
 Recorded at Albert Studios, Sydney, Australia

References 

1976 albums
John Paul Young albums
Albums produced by Harry Vanda
Albums produced by George Young (rock musician)
Albert Productions albums